The 2016–17 Cal Poly Mustangs men's basketball team represented the California Polytechnic State University in the 2016–17 NCAA Division I men's basketball season. The Mustangs, led by eighth-year head coach Joe Callero, played their home games at Mott Athletic Center as members of the Big West Conference. They finished the season 11–20, 6–10 in Big West play to finish in seventh place. They lost to UC Davis in the quarterfinals of the Big West tournament.

Previous season
The Mustangs finished the 2015–16 season 10–20, 4–12 in Big West play to finish in eighth place. They lost in the quarterfinals of the Big West tournament to UC Irvine.

Offseason

Departures

Incoming transfers

2016 recruiting class

Roster

Schedule and results

|-
!colspan=9 style=| Non-conference regular season

|-
!colspan=9 style=| Big West regular season

|-
!colspan=9 style=| Big West tournament

See also
 2016–17 Cal Poly Mustangs women's basketball team

References

Cal Poly Mustangs men's basketball seasons
Cal Poly
Cal Poly Mustangs men's basketball team
Cal Poly Mustangs men's basketball team